Majority Rules! is a Canadian teen comedy drama series which first aired on Teletoon in 2009. The series is also dubbed Votez Becky! for the French title.

Airing
The production company Entertainment One (at the time called E1 Entertainment) began filming for the first (and only) season on January 12, 2009. The show had the distinction of being the first near live-action regular program on Teletoon, an animation channel. Majority Rules! aired in the United States on Starz Kids & Family, starting in November 2013.

Synopsis
The series revolves around Rebecca "Becky" Richards (Tracy Spiridakos), a fifteen-year-old whose life is changed when she is elected mayor of her hometown of Mayfield. Even with the pressures of her extremely irregular life she manages to still have a smile on her face with the help of her friends Margo Dubois (Jenny Raven) and Kiki Kincaid (Sasha Clements).

Cast

Main
 Tracy Spiridakos as Becky Richards 
 Jenny Raven as Margo Dubois
 Sasha Clements as Kiki Kincaid

Recurring
 Dalmar Abuzeid as Jarmin
 Madison Cassaday as Mo
 Wesley Morgan as Jack Braddock
 Jackie Richardson as Mrs. DeMarco
 Shauna MacDonald as Alana Richards

Episodes
Go Girl!
There's Something Rotten in Mayfield
Day One
A Promising Start
Just Deserts
Great Eggs-pectations
Becky Knows Best
Me & My Big Ideas
A Tiny Glitch
Filibuster Club
Becky for a Day
Never Say Sorry
Pranked
Pageant Blues
Becky Takes a Pass
Art Show
Opposites Detract
Lost in the Woods
Boo Who?
Boo Who, Too
G is for Gavel
Strange Bedfellows
Me & My Shadow
Temporary Insanity
A Day in the Life
A Stitch in Time

References

External links
 

2009 Canadian television series debuts
2010 Canadian television series endings
2000s Canadian comedy-drama television series
2010s Canadian comedy-drama television series
2000s Canadian teen drama television series
2010s Canadian teen drama television series
English-language television shows
Television series by Entertainment One
Teletoon original programming
Television series about teenagers